Pethuchettypet is a village in Lawspet assembly constituency and Oulgaret (Uzhavarkarai) municipality, Puducherry, India.

Religious buildings
 Mariamman Temple
 Murugar Temple
 SakthiVel Temple
 Vinayagar Temple
 Ponni Amman Temple
 Vachani Amman Temple

Educational institutions
 Govt. Primary School
 Pandit Duraisamy Government High School
 Sithanandha Higher Secondary School

Villages in Puducherry district